"3AM" (stylized as "3 am" on the album and "3 AM" on the single) is the third single and the third track from American rock band Matchbox 20's debut album, Yourself or Someone Like You (1996). Written by Rob Thomas, Jay Stanley, John Leslie Goff, and Brian Yale, the song was inspired by Thomas dealing with his mother's cancer as a teenager. The song was officially serviced to US modern rock radio in October 1997 and was given a commercial release outside North America the following month.

"3AM" topped the Canadian RPM Top Singles chart for two weeks and the US Billboard Adult Pop Songs chart for 10 weeks; it was not eligible to chart on the Billboard Hot 100 at the time due to not receiving a physical release in the United States. Outside North America, "3AM" reached number 31 in Australia and became a minor hit in Europe. A music video was also made for the song, directed by Gavin Bowden and filmed in Los Angeles.

Background and content
"3AM" was written by Rob Thomas, Jay Stanley, John Leslie Goff, and Brian Yale while performing together in the early 1990s band Tabitha's Secret. The song was first recorded by that band on its debut EP, Tabitha's Secret?. The lyrics are inspired by Thomas as an adolescent having to live with a mother fighting to survive cancer. In 1997, after the other members of Tabitha's Secret left to form Matchbox 20, Goff and Stanley released other early recordings of the band, including "3 AM", on Don't Play with Matches.

Music video
The song's music video, directed by Gavin Bowden, was shot in Los Angeles. It features the band sitting on sides of a street next to some telephone booths. A supermarket is also shown. The video switches between color video clips and black-and-white still images. During the introduction and the third verse of the song, Thomas walks in the middle of the street with some construction signs and lights. During the third verse, a Pontiac Trans Am with a bare-chested man and a woman inside stops in front of Thomas. The man gets out, revealing a catheter in his chest, receives three cigarettes from Thomas and then gets back in the Trans Am. Finally, during the last two choruses, the band is shown playing their instruments (presumably in the lobby of a hotel or office building) as rain can be seen falling from a large window behind them. The video ends with an image of Thomas standing next to the telephone booths.

Track listings
Australian and UK CD single
 "3 AM" – 3:46
 "Push" (acoustic) – 4:19
 "Shame" – 3:35

UK 7-inch and cassette single; European CD single
 "3 AM" – 3:46
 "Push" (acoustic) – 4:19

Charts

Weekly charts

Year-end charts

Release history

See also
 List of RPM Rock/Alternative number-one singles (Canada)

References

External links
 Facts about Matchbox Twenty songs.

1996 songs
1997 singles
Atlantic Records singles
Lava Records singles
Matchbox Twenty songs
RPM Top Singles number-one singles
Song recordings produced by Matt Serletic
Songs about loneliness
Songs written by Rob Thomas (musician)
Songs about cancer